The South River is a  river in the U.S. state of Virginia.  Rising northeast of Swift Run Gap in Shenandoah National Park, the river flows southeast to the Rapidan River near Burtonville.  It is part of the Rappahannock River watershed. The whole river is within Greene County, Virginia.

See also
List of rivers of Virginia

References

USGS Hydrologic Unit Map - State of Virginia (1974)

Rivers of Virginia
Tributaries of the Rappahannock River